James Ssebaggala  is an Anglican bishop who serves in Uganda: he has been the fourth and current Bishop of Mukono since 2010.

A native of Mukono District he trained an architect in Entebbe. He studied for the priesthood at Uganda Christian University and was ordained in 1984. He has served in Uganda, Germany and Zambia.

On Jan 10, 2022, the day of Uganda schools reopening after nearly 2-years of COVID-19 closures, he made headlines for insisting that pregnant and breastfeeding girls not be allowed back in schools. This was in direct contradiction to Ministry of Education guidelines on school re-openings.

References

21st-century Anglican bishops in Uganda
Anglican bishops of Mukono
People from Mukono District
Uganda Christian University alumni
Year of birth missing (living people)
Living people
Ugandan architects